Canna 'Yellow King Humbert' Burbank is a medium sized Italian Group Canna cultivar; foliage green, but often variegated purple markings and occasionally whole leaves purple, oval shaped, spreading habit; oval stems, coloured green + purple; flower clusters are open, spotted, colours yellow with red spots, often large red markings and occasionally whole flowers red, staminodes are large; seed is sterile, pollen is sterile; rhizomes are long and thin, coloured white and purple; tillering is prolific.

This is the oldest known Canna chimera, the earliest research reference is Sonderegger Nursery Catalogue, United States, 1929. There is an early reference to Luther Burbank being the originator.

Origins
The earliest reference to this cultivar is in a US Gardening catalogue of 1929. It was reputed to be a mutation of Canna 'Roi Humbert' (synonym C. 'King Humbert') and was confirmed to be such by Dr Khoshoo in his published papers. On rare occasions it has also been known to produce stems where the foliage is all dark and the flowers are all red. That is the source of Canna 'Red King Humbert', amongst others.

All main catalogue references until the early 1990s are consistent in their descriptions of an Italian Group chimera cultivar, yellow with red spots. However, after that period there was some confusion and it found itself being used as a synonym for C. 'Austria' and its description was also confused with C. 'Roma'.

Synonyms
 ''Canna 'Anthony and Cleopatra' - name confined to Europe.
 Canna 'Cleopatra' - the name first appeared in US catalogs in the 1960s, not to be confused with C. 'Cleopatré' which is a Crozy Group cultivar from the 1890s.
 Canna 'Fusion' - name confined to eBay in USA.
 Canna 'Goldkrone' - confined to Europe.
 Canna 'Harlequin' - name appears to be confined to the USA.
 Canna 'Queen Helena' - name appears to be confined to the USA.
 Canna 'Queen of Italy' - name confined to India.
 Canna 'Spanish Emblem' - - name appears to be confined to the USA.
 Canna 'Striped Queen' - name confined to India.
 Canna'' 'Yellow Humbert' - first appeared in the 1990s, presumably as a shorthand for the correct name.

Gallery

Catalogue References
 Allen's Nurseries, Ohio, USA. Catalog 1939
 Allen's Nurseries, Ohio, USA. Catalog 1944
 Breck's Catalogue, USA, 1945
 Burgess Seed and Plant Co, USA, Catalogue 1939
 Burgess Seed and Plant Co, USA, Catalogue 1941
 Burpee, USA, Catalog 1946
 G.W. Park Seed Co, SC, USA,  Catalog 1938
 G.W. Park Seed Co, SC, USA,  Catalog 1939
 Henry Field's Catalogue, USA, 1969
 Inter-State Nurseries, Hamburg, Iowa, USA. Catalogue 1939
 Inter-State Nurseries, Hamburg, Iowa, USA. Catalogue 1950
 I.W. Scott Co., Pittsburgh. PA, USA, Catalogue 1939
 Montgomery Ward, USA, Catalogue 1949
 Montgomery Ward, USA, Catalogue 1953
 Montgomery Ward, USA, Catalogue 1955
 Montgomery Ward, USA, Catalogue 1961
 Montgomery Ward, USA, Catalogue 1964
 Naughton Farms, Waxahachie, Texas, USA. Catalogue 1945
 Olds' Seeds Catalogue, USA, 1947
 Peter Henderson & Co, Catalogue, USA, 1937
 Sears Garden Book, USA, 1951
 Sonderegger Catalogue, USA, 1929
 Westover Nursery, Clayton, USA. Catalog 1939

References

 Khoshoo, T.N. & Guha, I, Origin and Evolution of Cultivated Cannas, Vikas, India.
 RHS New Dictionary of Gardening, 1992

See also
 Canna
 Canna 'Roi Humbert'
 List of Canna cultivars
 List of Canna hybridists
 List of Canna species

Cannaceae
Ornamental plant cultivars